Shek O Beach is a gazetted beach located facing Island Bay in Shek O, Southern District, Hong Kong. The beach has barbecue pits and is managed by the Leisure and Cultural Services Department of the Hong Kong Government. The beach is about 230 metres long and is rated as Grade 1 by the Environmental Protection Department for its water quality.

History
On 25 October 2014, a 60-year-old man was found lying on the shore after being drowned while swimming near the beach. The police and the ambulance had arrived at the scene and confirmed that the man had died.

On 18 November 2018, a 12-year-old girl had drowned while swimming near the beach. She was rescued by a swimmer and was accompanied by her male relative and her friend to Pamela Youde Nethersole Eastern Hospital for treatment.

On 19 May 2019, a 69-year-old woman had drowned while swimming near the beach. She was unconscious when she was rescued by lifeguards and was taken by an ambulance to the hospital where she was certified dead.

On 25 November 2020, Li, a 14-year-old Form Two boy of Shau Kei Wan East Government Secondary School, died after being drowned while playing in the water with seven other classmates in the beach.

Usage
The rocky cliffs in the beach provide an excellent place for sports climbing and the beach offers views of Ng Fan Chau in Island Bay.

Features
The beach has the following features:
 BBQ pits (39 nos.)
 Changing rooms
 Showers
 Toilets
 Car park
 Light refreshment restaurant
 Water sports centre
 Playground
 Obstacle golf course

See also
 Beaches of Hong Kong

References

External links 

 Official website

Southern District, Hong Kong
Beaches of Hong Kong